Benapole Express (Train no. 795-796) is a non-stop intercity train which runs between Dhaka (capital of Bangladesh) and Benapole. The train connects capital to an important Land port of Bangladesh.

History 
There was no train service directly from Benapole to Dhaka. So Bangladesh government had decided to operate a new intercity train on Dhaka-Benapole route as the existing train makes 14 stops, taking the total travel time to 10 to 12 hours. In order to reach Dhaka, the passengers of India are facing extreme suffering. The only road to travel depends on the bus.
This breakthrough move saves at least 3 to 4 hours as Benapole Express is reaching its destination within 7–8 hours making only two stopovers at Airport and Iswardi station.
The Benapole Express has been scheduled to run non-stop for six days every week.

Naming 
The train is named after its final destination. At first, a few names including Bandar Express, Ichhamati Express and Benapole Express were proposed but Prime Minister Sheikh Hasina had finalized the name Benapole Express.

Coaches 
The Benapole Express has 896 seats. There are 12 new coaches on the train. Among them, two air-conditioned controlled.
There is a wheelchair system for disabled passengers, which is the first in Bangladesh.

The train's coaches have been procured from Indonesia. Benapole Express has the facilities which is similar to Biman Airlines.But in present benapole express run with LHB coach of Banglabandha express it has
1 Ac coach
7 non ac Coach
 2 power car

Halts 
The train will have stopovers in-
 Benapole
 Jashore
 Darshona Halt
 Chuadanga
 Ishwardi
 Airport railway station, Dhaka
 Kamalapur railway station

Schedule 
The train will leave Benapole at 12:45 pm and reach Dhaka at 20:55 pm. On the other hand, it will depart Dhaka for Beanpole at 11:15 am and reach Beanpole at 8 am.

Price 
The ticket price for the train has been fixed at ৳485 taka for Shovan chair, ৳1,047 taka for Snigdha, ৳1,213 taka for air-conditioned seats each and ৳1,869 taka for air-conditioned cabins.

Foods 
Two canteen are added to the train. Here burgers, cakes, sandwiches, patches, rolls, bread, tea, copies, cutlets, boiled eggs, fried chicken, kebab singers, samucha, various types of soft drinks and mineral water are available.

References

External links

Named passenger trains of Bangladesh